Béké or beke is an Antillean Creole term to describe a descendant of the early European, usually French, settlers in the French Antilles.

Etymology
The origin of the term is unclear, although it is attested to in colonial documents from as early as the first decade of the eighteenth century. It may well derive from Igbo phrases that describe Europeans. One Caribbean tradition holds that it originated from the question
« eh bé qué ? » (« eh bien quoi ? », similar to "What's up"), an expression picked up from the French settlers. Another explanation is that its origin lies in the term  « blanc des quais » ("a White from the quay") as the White colonists and merchants controlled the ports. In contrast, the "Blanc Créole" (or "Blan Kréyol" in creole) is use for White people born in the Antilles and adapted to the creole life who are not descendants of the first White settlers. "Blanc Pays" (or "Blan Péyi" in creole) is used to talk about the Béké of Guadeloupe.

In Guadeloupe one theory speaks also of the "Blanc Créole" or "Blan Kréyol", abbreviated to BK, ergo Béké.

Racial tension 
The békés represent a small minority in the French Antilles and control much of the local industry. The 2009 French Caribbean general strikes were to some degree aimed against the class difference that exists between the békés and the predominantly Black majority population.

See also
Buckra
Redleg
Zoreilles

William Balfour Baikie explored most of south east Nigeria and parts of cross rivers and Benue States. Ethnic groups in these areas also refer to a white person as 'ubekee' (Igede people in Benue State and parts of Cross Rivers State).

References 

Ethnic groups in Guadeloupe
Ethnic groups in Martinique
Society of Guadeloupe
Society of Martinique
Creole peoples
Ethno-cultural designations
European Caribbean